Osasco may refer to:

Places
Osasco, a city in São Paulo state, Brazil
Osasco, Piedmont, a commune in the province of Turin, Italy

Football clubs
Esporte Clube Osasco, a Brazilian football (soccer) club
Grêmio Esportivo Osasco, a Brazilian football (soccer) club
Osasco Futebol Clube, a Brazilian football (soccer) club